Sergio De Simone (born Naples, Italy November 29, 1937, died Hamburg, Germany, April 20, 1945) was a Neapolitan child victim of the Holocaust — arrested with his Jewish family while summering in Rijeka, (now Croatia, then part of the Kingdom of Italy); deported to Germany; subjected to human experimentation and subsequently murdered.

At age seven, De Simone was one of the children of the Bullenhuser-Damm Massacre. Twenty children of disparate nationalities were selected by Joseph Mengele as human subjects for medical experimentation by Kurt Heissmeyer at the Neuengamme concentration camp near Hamburg. As the Allies closed in on Hamburg and the perpetrators sought to destroy evidence of the experimentation, all 20 children, their four adult caretakers and 24 Soviet prisoners were taken to the basement of Hamburg's Bullenhuser Damm School — and murdered.

Although almost initially lost in the wake of WWII, the story and identity of the children was ultimately uncovered through the research of German journalist, Günther Schwarberg (1926-2008) and his wife, attorney Barbara Hüsing.  Today the children are remembered internationally; numerous books and films document their story, as well as a foundation: Children of Bullenhuser Damm.

On the street where Sergio De Simone's family lived in Naples, a memorial plaque and a pavement Stolperstein mark his life, which is commemorated annually on January 27 International Holocaust Remembrance Day.

Background

Sergio De Simone was born in the Vomero district of Naples, Italy, on November 29, 1937 — to Eduardo De Simone (unknown-1964), a Catholic, non-commissioned officer in the Italian Navy and Gisella Perlow. De Simone's mother, of Jewish origin, was born September 23, 1904 in Vidrinka, a town that no longer exists (possibly in Belarus, though more likely, Ukraine). The two met in Rijeka (on the Istrian Peninsula of what then belonged to the Kingdom of Naples), where Perlow's family lived. After marrying, the couple settled in Naples, on Via Morghen, not far above Piazza Vanvitelli.

In August 1943, with her husband called to the Navy (later taken to Dortmund as slave labor) and Italy having entered the war alongside Nazi Germany, Gisella Perlow was alone with her six-year old son — in Naples, which now experienced heavy bombings and where she risked being discovered in the hunt for Jews, by Nazi-fascists. Gisella unwittingly moved to Fiume (Rijeka) with Sergio — to join her mother, brothers and sisters at their home at Via Milano 17.  Rijeka was, at the time, part of the Kingdom of Italy.

Almost immediately, by September, Rijeka fell under German control. On March 21, 1944, betrayed by an acquaintance, Germans arrived up at the Perlow home and arrested the family, including Gisella, Sergio (then, age 6), and seven other family members, including his cousins (photo), Andra (6) and Tatiana Bucci (4). The latter would ultimately be the youngest Italian survivors of the Holocaust.

The Perlow family was taken to the Risiera di San Sabba concentration camp and immediately joined the group of deportees leaving on 29 March and arriving in  Auschwitz after six days in by convoy. Gisella and Sergio survived the first selection and Sergio was assigned with his cousins ​​in the Kinderblock (Children's hut).

Sergio's cousins Andra and Tatiana Bucci were with Sergio, had begun to understand German and had been warned that the guards could exploit the children's greatest vulnerability: they would line up the children and ask those who wanted to see their mother to step forward. In this way, the experimenters could easily walk their subjects away, without resistance. The sisters had warned Sergio, but with a single step he had unknowingly volunteered as one of Joseph Mengele's human subjects. The cousins would survive.

Neuengamme experimentation

Having been chosen in November 1944 by Joseph Mengele as one of the twenty children (10 boys and 10 girls) to be sent to the Neuengamme concentration camp, Sergio was made available as a human subject in Kurt Heissmeyer's tuberculosis experimentation.

As early as April 1944, Heissmeyer had conducted medical experiments on Russian POWs. As the court expert would later testify during the subsequent trials of the early 1960s, Heissmeyer had no scientific expertise or background in immunology or bacteriology, but based his work on pseudo-science, studies already considered scientifically unreliable at the time. But Heissmeyer was convinced that by injecting tuberculosis bacilli under a subject's skin, infection would form that would generate immune defense responses, leading to vaccinations against pulmonary tuberculosis. He was not discouraged by his first negative results and with influential support among the Nazi leaders, he insisted that the experiment continue, now with Jewish children.

On November 29, 1944, Sergio's seventh birthday, he and 19 other children, from France, the Netherlands, Yugoslavia, and Poland, arrived at the Neuengamme concentration camp, accompanied by Dr. Paulina Trocki and three nurses. In Neuengamme the children were entrusted to four deportees, charged with taking care of the group: the French doctors, René Quenouille and Gabriel Florence, and two Dutch nurses, Anton Hölzel and Dirk Deutekom.

For several weeks the children experienced a period of relative calm; the experiment required their good health. On January 9, 1945, Heissmeyer began the experiments: he had the skin on the chest of 11 children, under the right armpit, incised with X-shaped cuts, three to four centimeters long, to introduce tuberculosis bacilli with a spatula — causing rapid spread of the disease. In early March the children, sick and feverish, were operated on to remove their axillary lymph nodes, which according to the doctor's theories should have produced antibodies against tuberculosis.

A series of twenty surviving photographs document the operations; they show each child, shaven and shirtless, presenting their raised arms and their under-arm incisions. The experiment had failed: the removed lymphatic glands were sent to Hans Klein, a pathologist at the Hohenlychen clinic, who on March 12, 1945, certified to Heissmeyer that no antibodies had been generated.

Before leaving the extermination camp on January 17, 1945, the German SS burned all possible evidence attesting to what happened in Auschwitz-Birke-nau. Sergio's name appears in a rare exception, a medical report, one of the few documents not destroyed. The document, dated May 14, 1944, confirmed the presence of the children of Bullenhuser Damm.

Bullenhuser Damm Massacre

By the time his experiments failed and news traveled that the Allies were fast approaching, Heissmeyer had fled. The camp commander Max Pauly was left to deal with the children. On the evening of April 20, orders came directly from Berlin to eliminate all trace of what had transpired in Neuengamme.

At 10pm on the evening of April 20, the children, their four adult caretakers and several Soviet prisoners were loaded into a mail truck and driven the approximately 30 kilometers from the Kinderblock hut 4a, the site of the experimentation, to Bullenhuser Damm — along with Wilhelm Dreimann, Adolf Speck, Heinrich Wiehagen, their executioners, so-called SS doctor Alfred Trzebinski and Johann Frahm, German SS sergeant.

Johann Frahm, German SS sergeant at Neuengamme concentration camp and deputy camp commander at the Neuengamme satellite camp on Bullenhuser Damm, reported on May 2, 1946:

Eleven months later at the British Curiohaus Trials in Rotherbaum in March 1946, Trzebinski testified:

The massacre ended at dawn on the morning of April 21, with the killing of eight other Russian prisoners. The bodies were brought back to the Neuengamme concentration camp and cremated.

De Simone Family aftermath
Sergio's parents, Eduardo De Simone and Gisella Perlow De Simone survived the war. Sergio's mother had also been deported to Auschwitz and sent in the spring of 1945 to the Ravensbrück concentration camp, where she was released. Gravely ill, she was only able to return to Italy in November 1945 and reunite with Eduardo, who after 8 September had also been deported to the Dortmund labor camp in Germany. 13 members of Gisella Perlow's family had been apprehended before the war; four survived.

His parents had searched for news of Sergio, only learning in the late 1940s that their son had been transferred from Auschwitz to another camp. Gisella and her husband would have another son, Mario De Simone, born in 1946.

In the 1980s, around the time the story of the Bullenhuser Damm Massacre began to emerge, Sergio's mother began receiving letters from Hamburg, dismissing them because she didn't read German. In 1983, after the death of Sergio's father in 1964, his mother was informed of the massacre.  Mario De Simone later related that on learning of the atrocities, his mother — who had clung to the possibility of Sergio's survival — was deeply affected; her entire affect changed. She attended the memorial ceremony on April 20, 1984, in Hamburg and died in 1986, less than two years from learning of the Neuengamme experimentation and the Bullenhuser-Damm Massacre. Sergio's younger brother continues to advocate for human rights. In 2019, he said "my brother was murdered because he was comprising evidence."

Sergio's two cousins, sisters Anda and Tatiana (Tati) Bucci, survived and were initially relocated to Lingfield in England via Prague. In 2020, the sisters authored their story Storia di Sergio with  Alessandra Viola.  His two cousins describe Sergio's death "like a boulder that weighs inside us."

Legacy

In April 1946 the main material perpetrators of the massacre, including Commander Max Pauly who gave the final orders were tried by an English court and sentenced to death; carried out in October 1946. Although the responsibilities of Kurt Heissmeyer were brought to light in the trial, the German doctor was not indicted because he was not present at the massacre; he would continue his medical career unimpeded.

Though a small group of ex-Neuengamme ex-fellow prisoners continued to bring flowers each year to Bullenhuser Damm, collective memory of he massacre itself had almost been lost. after 1945 the Bullenhuser Damm building reopened as a school, without mention of the basement massacre. In 1959, German journalist Günther Schwarberg published a series of articles dedicated to the massacre in the weekly Stern, implicating Heissmeyer. The reopening of the trial in 1963 led to Heissmeyer's life sentence in 1966.  He died of a heart attack the following year in Bautzen prison.

Obersturmbannführer Arnold Strippel, the highest-ranking Nazi criminal involved in child murder, was sentenced to life imprisonment in 1949, but was released in 1969 and even received around 120,000 marks in compensation. He died a free man in 1994.

With his wife, attorney Barbara Hüsing, Schwarberg began the task of identifying and tracing the relatives of the murdered children, creating in 1979 the Association of The children of Bullenhuser Damm. From 1979, the association Children of Bullenhuser Damm underwrote the memorial for the victims of the massacre, until it was transferred to municipal sponsorship in 1999 and became a branch of the Neuengamme concentration camp memorial.

In 1980 (expanded in 2010–11), the cellar at the Bullenhuser Damm School was made a Holocaust museum, where the other children and adult victims of the massacre are commemorated.

Hamburg-Schnelsen

In 1991, 20 streets in the Schnelsen Burgwedel district of Hamburg were named after the children, including a street near Wassermann Park Sergio De Simone Stieg — as well as a kindergarten, playground and park

The park, Wassermannpark; is named after the eight-year old polish victim, known only as H. Wassermann.  Wassermannpark was completed in 1995, includes 28 hectares of water features, cycle paths, picnic areas, and playgrounds.

Roman-Zeller-Platz is named after one of the 20 children of Bullenhusen Damm. A masonry stele was erected on July 13, 2001 with a bronze relief of children by Russian artist Leonid Mogilevski (1931-). The stele was an initiative by, and paid for by, Hamburg citizens with underwriting by Kunststiftung Heinrich Stegemann.  Citizens of Hamburg attend the commemoration ceremony on April 20 every year.

Schnelsen/Burgwedel Stele:

Italy and Naples
In Italy, the story became widely known after with a series of publications by Maria Pia Bernicchia and Bruno Maida (see Bibliography). In 2006 a documentary retraced the story.

In the Vomero district of Naples, Italy, in front of the building where Sergio's family lived at Via Morghen 65 bis (at Via Bonito), a plaque marks Sergio's life and story.

Vomero Historic Marker, Via Morghen: 

On January 27, 2014, an annual Remembrance Day was inaugurated in Naples in his memory, in conjunction with International Holocaust Remembrance Day.

In 2020, a small engraved memorial Stolperstein or stumbling block (Italian: pietra d’inciampo) was laid at Piazza Bovio (at the Naples Royal Hospital for the Poor), marking those deported to concentration camps during the war, and including a block for Sergio.

In 2022, a small engraved memorial Stolperstein or stumbling block (Italian: pietra d’inciampo) was inlaid in front of his family's Vomero residence, in a ceremony attended by Sergio's younger brother Mario de Simone (born in 1946, after the war).

A street in Naples, near the Royal Palace of Copodimonte, is named after Sergio De Simone.

La Stella by Andra and Tati
Presented on April 13, 2018, in Turin, the animated feature La Stella by Andra and Tati was dedicated to the deportation of the Bucci sisters, Sergio's two cousins, to Auschwitz — becoming the first European animated film on the Holocaust. Focusing on his two cousins, the feature includes Sergio, up until he was separated from his cousins.

Debuting on the occasion of the 80th anniversary of the fascist racial laws in Italy, the 30-minute film, directed by Rosalba Vitellaro and Alessandro Belli, was presented at the International Animation Festival on the Bay, held in 2018 in the Piedmontese capital.

Kinderblock
Kinderblock: the Last Deception, is a 54-minute film, documenting the story of Kinderblock (the "children's block") and the massacre of Sergio, his cousins Andra and Tatiana and the children of Bullenhuser Damm.

Santobono Pediatric Hospital, Naples
On 9 February 2021, the emergency room of the Santobono Children's Hospital in Naples was named after Sergio de Simone. At the ceremony, the emergency room was declared "a place where help and care is offered to all children, regardless of their condition and creed.  It takes on greater symbolic value to remember those who were denied this and for whom the most humane of the practices, the care of the little ones, was transformed into."

See also

 The Holocaust in Italy
 Children in the Holocaust
 Association of the Children of Bullenhuser-Damm

References

Bibliography
 Storia di Sergio: 
 La Shoah dei bambini: 
 Who wants to see their mother, take a step forward: The 20 children of Bullenhuser Damm: 
 Better Not to Know: 
 Günther Schwarberg (1979–80) The SS Doctor and the Children : 

1937 births
1945 deaths
Children who died in Nazi concentration camps
Italian Jews who died in the Holocaust
Jewish children who died in the Holocaust